János Galgóczy de Sajógalgóc (c. 1715 – April 6, 1776) was a Hungarian prelate. Between 1744 and 1754 he served as Canon of the Roman Catholic Archdiocese of Esztergom. In 1776 he was appointed first Bishop of Rozsnyó (today: Rožňava), but died before taking charge. His successor was Count Antal Révay (1776–80).

References

1715 births
1776 deaths
18th-century Roman Catholic bishops in Hungary